The Arroyo Seco ("dry wash") is a major tributary of the Salinas River in central California.

Name
"Arroyo Seco" means "dry streambed" or "dry wash" in Spanish. The river above the Salinas Valley is actually a fairly large perennial stream. The common name, Arroyo Seco River or Arroyo Seco Creek, is actually a tautology because the name contains two mentions of "watercourse", thus "Arroyo Seco River" literally translates to "dry streambed river".

Course
The river rises in several unnamed forks in the Santa Lucia Mountains of the Coast Ranges near the Pacific Ocean. It flows generally north, cutting into a steep gorge, receiving Lost Valley Creek and Tassajara Creek both from the left. After the confluence with Rocky Creek, the Arroyo Seco swings abruptly east, passing a pair of intermittent natural lakes simply known as "The Lakes". Here, the valley begins to widen and the stream lazes out onto a shallower, sandier bed, passing the unincorporated communities of Millers Ranch and Sycamore Flat. Another major tributary, Piney Creek, enters just downstream of the former.

The river flows north into the Salinas Valley, where much of its water is diverted for irrigation. Turning northwest, it begins to parallel U.S. Highway 101 as a seasonally dry wash. It joins the Salinas just south of the city of Soledad. The source, mouth and entire course of the river are entirely within Monterey County. There are no dams on the Arroyo Seco, making it prone to flash flooding.

Watershed
Draining , the Arroyo Seco River is the last major tributary of the Salinas River that enters before it reaches the Pacific. Most of the watershed lies in the rugged coastal range areas southwest of Greenfield and Soledad, and the drainage divide runs along the crest of the Santa Lucia Mountains to the west and the lower Sierra de Salinas to the northeast. Watersheds bordering the Arroyo Seco drainage are those of the Carmel River and Big Sur River to the northwest, multiple small creeks flowing into the Pacific on the west, the San Antonio River to the south, and other smaller tributaries of the Salinas on the east.

Ecology
Because of its relatively pristine condition, the Arroyo Seco River in the foothills and mountains supports a rich riparian zone habitat that is home to such sensitive species as the southwestern pond turtle and California spotted owl. The only perennial Salinas River tributary without dams, the river also supports a respectable run of steelhead trout, one of the last remnant populations along the Central California coast. Tributaries such as Tassajara Creek, Church Creek and Roosevelt Creek also maintain sizable populations of steelhead. The Arroyo Seco is considered a potential candidate for inclusion in the National Wild and Scenic Rivers system.

See also
List of rivers of California

References

Names. University of California Press. .

Rivers of Monterey County, California
Salinas River (California)
Santa Lucia Range
Washes of California
Rivers of Northern California